Júlia Németh (born 4 October 1991 in Veszprém) is a Hungarian football goalkeeper currently playing in the Hungarian First Division for Ferencváros. She is a member of the Hungarian national team.

References

1991 births
Living people
Hungarian women's footballers
Hungary women's international footballers
Ferencvárosi TC (women) footballers
People from Veszprém
Women's association football goalkeepers
Sportspeople from Veszprém County
21st-century Hungarian women